Matthew Kenneth Frevola (born June 11, 1990) is an American professional mixed martial artist currently competing in the Lightweight division of the Ultimate Fighting Championship. A professional competitor since 2014, he has also competed for the World Series of Fighting and Titan FC.

Background
Born and raised in Long Island, New York, Frevola began competing in sports from a young age; he played football, lacrosse, wrestling, and baseball. Frevola attended Harborfields High School, where he started wrestling and also picked up Brazilian jiu-jitsu during high school. Frevola then attended the Reserve Officers' Training Corps program of University of Tampa. Frevola is a lieutenant in the United States Army Reserve.

Mixed martial arts career

Early career
Frevola compiled an undefeated amateur record of 8–0 from 2011 to 2014, when he made his professional debut. Winning his first five professional bouts, he was selected to compete on Dana White's Contender Series 8 on August 29, 2017. Frevola defeated 7–0 Jose Flores via second-round submission and was awarded a UFC contract.

Ultimate Fighting Championship
Frevola made his promotional debut against Polo Reyes at UFC Fight Night: Stephens vs. Choi on January 14, 2018. He lost via first-round knockout.

Frevola faced Lando Vannata on November 3, 2018, at UFC 230. The bout ended in a majority draw. 

Frevola faced Jalin Turner on April 13, 2019 at UFC 236. He won the fight by unanimous decision.

As the first fight of his four-fight contract, Frevola faced Luis Peña on October 12, 2019, at UFC Fight Night 161. He won the fight via split decision.

Frevola was expected to face Roosevelt Roberts on April 25, 2020. However, on April 9, Dana White, the president of UFC announced that the event would be postponed to a future date. Instead, Frevola was set to face Frank Camacho on June 20, 2020, at UFC Fight Night: Blaydes vs. Volkov, however, on June 18, it was revealed that Frevola was pulled from the bout after one of his cornermen tested positive for COVID-19.

A bout with Roosevelt Roberts was rescheduled for UFC Fight Night 177 on September 12, 2020. However, Frevola pulled out of the bout against Roberts on September 11, 2020, citing an injury. He was replaced by newcomer Kevin Croom. 

Frevola was expected to face Ottman Azaitar on January 24, 2021, at UFC 257. However, on the day of the weigh-ins it was announced that Azaitar was pulled from the bout after it was determined that he had violated COVID-19 health and safety protocols. In turn, Azaitar was removed from the UFC's designated safety zone on Yas Island and released from the promotion. As a result, the promotion negotiated a matchup between Frevola and Arman Tsarukyan (whose original opponent had also been removed from the card) to keep both fighters on the card. Subsequently, Tsarukyan forfeited 20% of his purse as a result of missing weight, which went to Frevola. Frevola lost the fight via unanimous decision.

Frevola was again scheduled to face Frank Camacho on June 12, 2021, at UFC 263. However, Camacho pulled out of the fight during the week leading up to the event after he was involved in a traffic accident in Orange County, California that left him with non-life threatening injuries to his back and neck. In turn, Frevola faced promotional newcomer Terrance McKinney instead. Frevola lost the fight via knockout 7 seconds into the first round.

For the last fight of his prevailing contract, Frevola faced Genaro Valdéz on January 22, 2022, at UFC 270. After knocking down Valdéz multiple times, Frevola won the fight via technical knockout in round one.

The bout between Frevola and Ottman Azaitar was rescheduled for November 12, 2022 at UFC 281. He won the fight via knockout in the first round.

Frevola is scheduled to face Drew Dober on May 6, 2023, at UFC 288. at UFC 288.

Personal life
Frevola graduated from University of Tampa with a bachelor's degree in Criminology. Frevola is a member of the United States Army Reserves as an Engineer Officer.

Mixed martial arts record

|-
|Win
|align=center|10–3–1
|Ottman Azaitar
|KO (punch)
|UFC 281
|
|align=center|1
|align=center|2:30
|New York City, New York, United States
|
|-
|Win
|align=center|9–3–1
|Genaro Valdéz
|TKO (punches)
|UFC 270
|
|align=center|1
|align=center|3:15
|Anaheim, California, United States
|
|-
|Loss
|align=center|8–3–1
|Terrance McKinney
|KO (punches)
|UFC 263
|
|align=center|1
|align=center|0:07
|Glendale, Arizona, United States
|
|-
|Loss
|align=center|8–2–1
|Arman Tsarukyan
|Decision (unanimous)
|UFC 257
|
|align=center|3
|align=center|5:00
|Abu Dhabi, United Arab Emirates
|
|-
|Win
|align=center|8–1–1
|Luis Peña
|Decision (split)
|UFC Fight Night: Joanna vs. Waterson
|
|align=center|3
|align=center|5:00
|Tampa, Florida, United States
|
|-
|Win
|align=center|7–1–1
|Jalin Turner
|Decision (unanimous)
|UFC 236
|
|align=center|3
|align=center|5:00
|Atlanta, Georgia, United States
|
|-
|Draw
|align=center|6–1–1
|Lando Vannata
|Draw (majority)
|UFC 230
|
|align=center|3
|align=center|5:00
|New York City, New York, United States
|
|-
|Loss
|align=center|6–1
|Polo Reyes
|KO (punches)
|UFC Fight Night: Stephens vs. Choi
|
|align=center|1
|align=center|1:00
|St. Louis, Missouri, United States
|
|-
|Win
|align=center|6–0
|Jose Flores
|Submission (arm-triangle choke)
|Dana White's Contender Series 8
|
|align=center|2
|align=center|3:32
|Las Vegas, Nevada, United States
|
|-
|Win
|align=center|5–0
|Raush Manfio
|Decision (unanimous)
|Titan FC 43
|
|align=center|3
|align=center|5:00
|Coral Gables, Florida, United States
|
|-
|Win
|align=center|4–0
|Trent McDade
|Submission (guillotine choke)
|RFC 37: No Mercy
|
|align=center|1
|align=center|0:55
|Tampa, Florida, United States
|
|-
|Win
|align=center|3–0
|Emmanuel Ramirez
|Decision (unanimous)
|Absolute Fighting Championship 25
|
|align=center|3
|align=center|5:00
|Coconut Creek, Florida, United States
|
|-
| Win
|align=center|2–0
|Mike D'Angelo
|KO (punch)
|RFC 35: Showdown
|
|align=center|1
|align=center|2:46
|Tampa, Florida, United States
|
|-
|Win
|align=center|1–0
|Josh Zuckerman
|Submission (triangle armbar)
|World Series of Fighting 15: Branch vs. Okami
|
|align=center|1
|align=center|2:50
|Tampa, Florida, United States
|

References

External links

1990 births
Living people
American male mixed martial artists
Lightweight mixed martial artists
Mixed martial artists utilizing wrestling
Mixed martial artists utilizing Brazilian jiu-jitsu
Mixed martial artists from New York (state)
People from Huntington, New York
Sportspeople from Suffolk County, New York
University of Tampa alumni
Ultimate Fighting Championship male fighters
American practitioners of Brazilian jiu-jitsu